Çagagüzer is the former name (prior to 1993) of a village in eastern Turkmenistan near the border with Afghanistan. It is located in Burguçy geňeşligi, Kerki District, Lebap Province.

Nearby towns and villages include Gyzylaýak (5.0 nm), Oba (5.0 nm), Agar (4.3 nm), Jyňňylhatap (1.7 nm), Hatap (4.8 nm), Mukry (1.6 nm) and Birleşik (1.9 nm). 
 
The nearest airport is 16 miles away at Kerki.

See also 
List of cities, towns and villages in Turkmenistan
OpenStreetMap / Districts in Turkmenistan

References

Populated places in Lebap Region